Juan Pablo Alfaro Guzmán (born 2 March 1979) is a Mexican former footballer and current manager of Liga MX Femenil club Guadalajara (women).

Career
Alfaro is known as "El Pato" (The Duck) to many fans. He started his career with Chivas de Guadalajara in 1999. He later moved on with Toluca in 2002. Alfaro returned to Chivas in 2003, and scored against Argentine superpower Boca Juniors in the 4-0 Chivas win. El Pato then moved to C.F. Pachuca, and then transferred in CD Veracruz. then to Toluca for a little bit but went back to Veracruz.

Honours
Pachuca
Copa Sudamericana: 2006

References

External links
 
 
 

1979 births
Living people
Footballers from Guadalajara, Jalisco
Association football midfielders
Mexican footballers
C.D. Guadalajara footballers
Deportivo Toluca F.C. players
C.F. Pachuca players
C.D. Veracruz footballers
Atlético Mexiquense footballers
La Piedad footballers
Lobos BUAP footballers
Leones Negros UdeG footballers
Tecos F.C. footballers
Alebrijes de Oaxaca players
Coras de Nayarit F.C. footballers